Murder on the Campus is a 1933 American pre-Code mystery film directed by Richard Thorpe. The film is also known as On the Stroke of Nine in the United Kingdom. It is based on the novel The Campanile Murders, by Whitman Chambers (Appleton, 1933).

Plot
Reporter Bill Bartlett is researching a piece on students, but soon finds himself investigating a murder. He hears a gunshot coming from a college bell  tower, and finds himself a murder suspect when police captain Ed Kyne discovers him at the scene of the crime. Bartlett also finds himself in love with one of the chief suspects, Lillian Voyne, and is designated to cover the story as a reporter. After two more men are killed, Bartlett enlists the help of C. Edson Hawley, respected college professor and amateur detective.

Cast 
Charles Starrett as Bill Bartlett
Shirley Grey as Lillian Voyne
J. Farrell MacDonald as Police Capt. Ed Kyne
Ruth Hall as Ann Michaels
Dewey Robinson as Detective Sgt. Charlie Lorrimer
Maurice Black as Blackie Atwater
Edward Van Sloan as Prof. C. Edson Hawley
Jane Keckley as Hilda Lund

Critical reception
TV Guide wrote, "the plot of this tidy suspense mystery is developed neatly, with a believable solution to the murders"; and Shades of Grey wrote, "after a shakey start (with some pretty lame acting by Starrett and Grey), Murder on the Campus comes together as a fine little murder mystery."

References

External links 

1933 films
American mystery films
1930s English-language films
American black-and-white films
Films about fraternities and sororities
Chesterfield Pictures films
1933 mystery films
Films about fratricide and sororicide
Films directed by Richard Thorpe
1930s American films